Kung Aagawin Mo ang Lahat sa Akin (International title: When All is Gone / ) is a 2009 Philippine television drama romance series broadcast by GMA Network. Based on a 1987 Philippine film of the same title, the series is the fifteenth instalment of Sine Novela. Directed by Topel Lee and Rommel Gacho, it stars Maxene Magalona, Glaiza de Castro, JC Tiuseco and Patrick Garcia. It premiered on June 22, 2009 on the network's Dramarama sa Hapon line up replacing Dapat Ka Bang Mahalin?. The series concluded on September 25, 2009 with a total of 70 episodes. It was replaced by Tinik sa Dibdib in its timeslot.

Cast and characters

Lead cast
 Maxene Magalona as Maureen Andrada / Dahlia Del Monte
 Glaiza de Castro as Gladys Andrada
 Patrick Garcia as Arvin Samaniego
 JC Tiuseco as Troy Samaniego

Supporting cast
 Jackie Lou Blanco as Clara Andrada
 Nonie Buencamino as Gilbert Andrada
 Joanne Quintas as Romina Samaniego
 Emilio Garcia as Victor Samaniego
 Karla Estrada as Remy Del Monte / Brenda Aguirre
 Jackie Rice as Mercedita Andrada
 Pochollo Montes as Dean Del Monte
 Rich Asuncion as Joyce Delos Santos
 Aurora Sevilla as Rosita Aguirre
 Christine Joy Velasco as Maverick

Guest cast
 Francis Magundayao as young Arvin
 Gail Lardizabal as young Gladys

Ratings
According to AGB Nielsen Philippines' Mega Manila household television ratings, the pilot episode of Kung Aagawin ang Lahat sa Akin earned an 18.6% rating. While the final episode scored a 23.7% rating.

Accolades

References

External links
 

2009 Philippine television series debuts
2009 Philippine television series endings
Filipino-language television shows
GMA Network drama series
Live action television shows based on films
Philippine romance television series
Television shows set in the Philippines